Warszewiczia (or Warscewiczia) is a genus of flowering plants in the family Rubiaceae. They are primarily tropical Central and South American trees and shrubs. Perhaps the most famous member of the genus is W. coccinea (chaconia), which is the national flower of Trinidad and Tobago.

Description
The inflorescences show leaf-shaped, bright-colored calycophylls, expanded foliaceous structures made from floral petaloids with enlarged showy calyx-lobes. Their main task is to attract pollinators.

Taxonomy
This genus was named after Józef Warszewicz, a 19th-century Polish orchid collector and inspector of the botanic gardens in Kraków, Poland. Warszawa is also the Polish name for Warsaw – capital city of Poland.

Species

External links
World Checklist of Rubiaceae

Rubiaceae genera
Dialypetalantheae
Flora of Central America
Flora of the Caribbean
Flora of northern South America
Taxa named by Johann Friedrich Klotzsch